The Israeli Women's Cup (Gvia HaMedina Nashim) is the annual knock-out tournament of women's football teams in Israel. It is equivalent to the men's Israel State Cup, and organized by the Israel Football Association (IFA). Its first season was played in 1998–99.   Maccabi Holon had won the most titles, winning for the ninth time in 2012–13.

Format
The competition is a knockout tournament which includes all members of Ligat Nashim, the Israeli women's football league. Each tie is played as a single leg. If a match is drawn, the game is settled with extra time and penalty shootouts.

List of finals
The list of finals:

Ligat Nashim Shniya Cup
For three seasons, between 2010–11 and 2012–13, the IFA arranged a cup competition for Ligat Nashim Shniya.

See also
Israel State Cup, men's equivalent

Sport in Israel
Football in Israel
Women's football in Israel
Ligat Nashim
Israel women's national football team
Israel women's national football team results
List of Israel women's international footballers
Israel women's national under-19 football team
Israel women's national under-17 football team
Israel national football team

References

External links
in football.org.il
Cup at women.soccerway.com

Isr
Football competitions in Israel
Recurring sporting events established in 1998
Israel State Cup
Women's sports competitions in Israel
1998 establishments in Israel